Bill Crutchfield (May 7, 1926 – September 27, 1982) was an American football player and coach. He served as the head football coach at Atlantic Christian College from 1949 to 1950 and Presbyterian College from 1954 to 1956. He later served as an assistant coach at Wake Forest University from 1958 to 1959.

Crutchfield died in Tallahassee, Florida on September 27, 1982, at the age of 56.

Head coaching record

References

External links
 Pro Football Archives profile

1926 births
1982 deaths
American football fullbacks
Atlanta Falcons coaches
Barton Bulldogs football coaches
Florida State Seminoles football coaches
Furman Paladins football coaches
Miami Hurricanes football coaches
Georgia Tech Yellow Jackets football coaches
North Carolina Tar Heels football players
Presbyterian Blue Hose football coaches
Wake Forest Demon Deacons football coaches
High school football coaches in Ohio
People from Orangeburg, South Carolina
Players of American football from South Carolina